Jalapa is a city and a municipality in the Nueva Segovia Department of Nicaragua. It is located in northern Nicaragua, close to the Honduras border.

Jalapa has been Boulder, Colorado's sister city since 1983.

Contra war

Jalapa, which is located on the border of Honduras, was the location of two failed attempts of the CIA funded Contras to overthrow the city and install a provisional government, in late 1982 and December 1983, in which the CIA informed the contras would be immediately recognized by the United States Government.

International relations

Sister city
Jalapa's sister city is:
 Boulder, Colorado, United States, since 1987

See also
Friendship City Project: Boulder Jalapa

Notes

Municipalities of the Nueva Segovia Department